God Is an Astronaut is a self-titled studio album by Irish post-rock band God Is an Astronaut. It was released digitally on November 1, 2008. It was released on CD on November 8, 2008, through Revive Records. It was released on vinyl LP by Morningrise Records and in Japan, with bonus live tracks, in 2009. The album was mastered by Tim Young at Metropolis Mastering in London and produced by the band.

In December 2008, American webzine Somewhere Cold voted God Is an Astronaut Album of the Year in their "2008 Somewhere Cold Awards Hall of Fame."

Critical reception
AllMusic wrote that "the melodies at the heart of these tunes are romantic and often darkly sentimental, but they are delivered in a Wall of Sound of loud guitars and sprawling synthesizer textures that do a great job of evoking the vast fiery spaces and restless mood of the cover artwork."

Track listing 
All Songs written by Torsten Kinsella, Niels Kinsella, Lloyd Hanney and Thomas Kinsella, Zachary Dutton Hanney, Colm Hassett

Personnel
 God Is An Astronaut
 Torsten Kinsella - guitars, keyboards, vocals, programming
 Niels Kinsella - bass guitar, guitars, keyboards
 Lloyd Hanney – drums

 Production
 Tim Young – mastering
 Torsten Kinsella – mixing
 Dave King artwork
 Niels Kinsella – design

Additional musicians 
 Colm Hassett - percussion
 Dara O'Brien - sitar
 Chris Hanney – Guitar
 Zachary Dutton Hanney - guitar

References

2008 albums
God Is an Astronaut albums
Revive Records albums